Obertoggenburg District is a former district of the canton of St. Gallen in Switzerland.

Former districts of the canton of St. Gallen